Exodontha is a genus of soldier flies in the family Stratiomyidae.

Species
Exodontha dubia (Zetterstedt, 1838)
Exodontha luteipes (Williston, 1885)

References

Stratiomyidae
Brachycera genera
Taxa named by Camillo Rondani
Diptera of North America